The European Pollen Database (EPD) is a freely available database of pollen frequencies, past and present, in the larger European area.

The database is hosted by the "Institut Méditerranéen d'Ecologie et de la Biodiversité (IMBE)".

References

 Fyfe, R. M. et al. (2009) The European Pollen Database: past efforts and current activities. Vegetation History and Archaebotany 18:417-424  (Open Access)

External links
 Home page of the European Pollen Database

Biological databases
Databases in Europe
Online botany databases
Palynology